The 1981 season was the twelfth season of national competitive association football in Australia and 98th overall.

National teams

Australia national soccer team

Results and fixtures

1982 FIFA World Cup qualification

Australia women's national soccer team

Men's football

National Soccer League

Cup competitions

NSL Cup

Final

References

External links
 Football Australia official website

1981 in Australian soccer
Seasons in Australian soccer